Passfield is a small village in the East Hampshire district of Hampshire, England. The village was once a main crossing point between Liphook and Petersfield, which gives its name 'Passfield'.

Local features

The village has a store, a business centre, a village hall and formerly a pub, The Passfield Oak.

Passfield Common

References

External links

Villages in Hampshire